Carbon Transit (CT) is a public transit agency providing bus service in Carbon County in the U.S. state of Pennsylvania. The agency operates fixed-route bus service, which connects points within the county, and Shared Ride paratransit service. CT is administered by the Lehigh and Northampton Transportation Authority (LANTA) under contract with Carbon County and is operated by Easton Coach Company.

Services
CT operates fixed-route bus service called CT Bus, which consists of two routes serving points in Carbon County and offering connections to LANTA Route 325 in Palmerton. The routes operate on different days during the week. CT Flex is a reservation-based on-demand shared ride service serving Jim Thorpe, Penn Forest Township, and Kidder Township. CT operates Shared Ride paratransit service in Carbon County for persons who are unable to use fixed-route bus service. Paratransit trips must be made through advance reservations.

CT Bus routes
CT operates the following CT Bus routes:

Fares
For fixed-route service, the base fare is $1.50 for trips within or between Carbon and Schuylkill counties. Children age 5 and under with a fare-paying adult and senior citizens age 65 and over with a Senior Citizen ID or Medicare Card ride for free. Persons with disabilities ride for half fare with a PennDOT Reduced Fare Card or Medicare Card.

Self-pay consumers ride paratransit for 15% of the full fare while Carbon County Area Agency on Aging consumers ride paratransit for 5% of the full-fare.

References

External links
Official website

Bus transportation in Pennsylvania
Transportation in Carbon County, Pennsylvania